Blankenberge is a railway station in Blankenberge, West Flanders, Belgium. The station opened on 16 August 1863 on the Line 51.

Blankenberge station is run by NMBS and is a terminal station located on the railway line from Brugge railway station and has services to Brussels South and beyond to Leuven.

History
The railway from Bruges to Blankenberge was first used on Sunday 26 July 1863. The construction of the line took less than a year and the materials for the construction were delivered by ship to Bruges along the Oostendse Vaart canal. At 12 o'clock on that day the first train, formed of 3 or 4 carriages left for Blankenberge, arriving there about 45 minutes later. From the 16 August the railway opened to passenger service. On 12 July 1868 the extension to Heist was put into use.

Since 1890 the Kusttram has served the station and connected the town with Heist and Knokke to the north and Ostend and De Panne to the south. Between Blankenberge and Heist, the railway and tramline ran parallel.

On 1 October 1908 Blankenberge became a terminus when the section to Zeebrugge was closed to allow for the expansion of the port of Zeebrugge. A new railway line was built between Bruges and Zeebrugge, which joined with the line to Heist.

Train services
The station is served by the following service(s):

Intercity services (IC-03) Blankenberge - Bruges - Ghent - Brussels - Leuven - Genk

Tram services
The Kusttram station is located outside the station with trams westbound to Oostende and beyond, and eastbound to Knokke railway station, these are operated by De Lijn.

Bus services
Bus services 33, 38 serve the station, these are operated by De Lijn.

External links

Belgian Railways website
De Lijn website

Railway stations in Belgium
Railway stations opened in 1863
Railway stations in West Flanders
Blankenberge